Blue Origin NS-21 was a sub-orbital spaceflight mission, operated by Blue Origin, which launched on 4 June 2022 using the New Shepard rocket. It was Blue Origin's fifth crewed flight, and twenty-first overall to reach space.

The mission was originally scheduled to launch on 20 May 2022. However, the flight was delayed due to a back-up system not meeting the "expectations for performance," and the new 4 June launch date was announced on 31 May 2022.

Apollo 16 astronaut Charles Duke was a guest of Blue Origin attending the launch.

Crew 
The NS-21 crew was nicknamed the "Crew of Natural Selection".

The crew of six included Evan Dick, who previously flew onboard Blue Origin NS-19, making him the first person to fly on New Shepard twice. Also onboard was Katya Echazarreta, who became the first Mexican-born woman and youngest American woman to fly to space, and Victor Vescovo, a notable undersea explorer. The flight made Vescovo the first person to complete the Explorers' Extreme Trifecta, which involves travelling to the bottom of the Challenger Deep, the summit of Mount Everest, and flying to space.

Echazarreta's seat was sponsored by the Space For Humanity initiative, and paid for by Blue Origin and NS-19 passengers Lane and Cameron Bess. She is a post-graduate student at Johns Hopkins University who has done work on the Mars 2020 and Europa Clipper missions.

Victor Correa Hespanha was the second Brazilian in space. He was selected to fly after buying an NFT for R$ 4,000 (US$) from the Crypto Space Agency. He has been called the “world’s first cryptonaut.”

References 

 
Space tourism
2022 in spaceflight
Aviation history of the United States
Suborbital human spaceflights
2022 in Texas
2022 in aviation
New Shepard missions